Gabrielse Cone is a remarkably fresh, clearly postglacial monogenetic cinder cone, located in the Tuya Volcanic Field in British Columbia, Canada. It is Holocene in age and to its northeast appears to be breached with the remnants of a lava flow. The cone is near the headwaters of Iverson Creek.

Gabrielse Cone is named after Hu Gabrielse, a Canadian geologist who first identified the cone.

See also
List of volcanoes in Canada
List of Northern Cordilleran volcanoes
Volcanism of Western Canada
Toozaza Peak

References

Cinder cones of British Columbia
Northern Cordilleran Volcanic Province
Cassiar Country
Holocene volcanoes
Monogenetic volcanoes
Stikine Ranges
One-thousanders of British Columbia